POM Wonderful, LLC is a private company which sells an eponymous brand of beverages and fruit extracts. It was founded in 2002 by the billionaire industrial agriculture couple Stewart and Lynda Rae Resnick. Through The Wonderful Company, their holding company, they are also affiliated with Teleflora, FIJI Water, pesticide manufacturer Suterra, and Paramount Agribusiness. In 2010, the company was warned by the FDA for making false health claims and for marketing statements that promoted their products as unauthorized drugs.

Products
The company's main product is pomegranate juice, which is sold in a trademark "double-bulb" bottle with the product name, POM, featured in capital letters where the O is substituted by a heart symbol. The company also manufactures blended juice beverages, such as pomegranate juice mixed with juices of blueberry, cranberry, cherry, mango or tangerine, and bottled tea- and coffee-based beverages of various flavors distributed in more conventional containers. In addition to drinks, the company sells pills and concentrated liquid products marketed as nutritional supplements. In 2017, POM Wonderful acquired the pomegranate distributor Ruby Fresh.

While not part of POM Wonderful itself, another company owned by the same Resnick family, Paramount Farms, has extended the "Wonderful" brand to pistachios. The Wonderful Pistachios logotype uses a heart instead of the "o" in "Wonderful", similar to the "POM" in the POM Wonderful logo.

The fruit

The brand name "POM Wonderful" refers to the "Wonderful" cultigen of pomegranate which is grown in the central and southern San Joaquin Valley of Central California. It is the leading commercial variety in California, being well suited for juicing with its soft seeds, high water content, and wine-like flavor.
POM branded products are produced from fruit obtained from their own corporate orchards, and other orchards in the same area. The company employs a proprietary process in their own facilities to mechanically extract juice for various pomegranate based products.

Sponsorship of research
POM Wonderful makes claims in promotional materials to have spent tens of millions of dollars for research. There are two broad types of research being sponsored and published. One type regards the proposed health benefits of pomegranate juice, the other type regards chemical analysis and bio-availability of pomegranate extracts and supplements. Pomegranate juice in general is the actual subject of its published sponsored research regarding health benefits, though POM typically supplies the juice to the investigators of the study. Published sponsored research regarding POM's extract products (pills and liquid concentrates) deal only with chemical analysis and bio-availability of said products, without examining any health benefits. Research has been conducted at various research institutions including UCLA, University of Naples, Technion – Israel Institute of Technology, and the University of Wisconsin-Madison. The company has promoted these studies as indicating that consumers of their beverages and extracts will receive a wide range of health benefits against various chronic diseases such as heart disease, cancer, diabetes, and erectile dysfunction.

In 2006, POM became the target of PETA for funding laboratory experiments on animals to promote health claims related to its pomegranate beverages. One such experiment sought to examine a possible correlation between pomegranates and erectile dysfunction by inducing the disorder in live rabbits. In their campaign, PETA had rebranded the company's logo as "POM Horrible." After receiving petitions from PETA supporters and threats from Whole Foods and other retailers who said they would pull POM's drinks from store shelves if POM Wonderful continued to fund experiments on animals, the company agreed to only fund non-animal studies. Nevertheless, POM Wonderful stated that their animal tests were "helping to save human lives" and could have benefited its customers.

Legal actions

FTC cease and desist order
On February 23, 2010, the U.S. Food and Drug Administration (FDA) informed the company in a warning letter that POM Wonderful was "[promoting] (POM Wonderful 100% Pomegranate Juice) for conditions that cause the product to be a drug".

Examples of unapproved labeling cited in the warning letter come from a section of POM's website titled "Featured Scientific Studies" which contained health claims regarding "Prostate Cancer", "Erectile Dysfunction", "Reducing LDL cholesterol", "promote(ing) a healthy heart and prostate", "reduce(ing) the length and severity of colds", "...shown to slow prostate tumor growth", "particularly beneficial ("among quite a few others")."

FDA contends that if the manufacturer desires to market its products with claims for the cure, mitigation, treatment, or prevention of disease, the product is subject to the typical scientific rigor of the drug approval process to achieve such claims.

POM's labeling as a food is also criticized in the letter due to a product claim of being "full of antioxidants called phytochemicals" and having "uniquely high levels of powerful antioxidants". Such nutrient content claims on food must have a scientifically validated Dietary Reference Intake value and the names of such nutrients included. Simply using the terms "antioxidants" and "phytochemicals" is not specific enough for food nutrient labeling requirements because phytochemicals in pomegranate juice have not yet been defined with actual physiological properties in humans.

On September 27, 2010, the Federal Trade Commission issued an administrative complaint against POM Wonderful saying it had made "false and unsubstantiated claims that their products will prevent or treat heart disease, prostate cancer, and erectile dysfunction." The complaint is a legal order intended to prevent future law violations by POM Wonderful.

POM is quoted as responding that "all statements made in connection with POM products are true ... and as strong advocates of honest labeling and fair advertising, we are looking forward to working with the agency to resolve this matter."  The FDA warning letter makes it clear that it expects POM to correct "deficiencies in your products or ... labeling" within 15 days.

On May 22, 2012, Chief Administrative Law Judge Michael Chappell ruled after a hearing that the company's claims were deceptive and issued a cease and desist order effective for 20 years.The greater weight of the persuasive expert testimony demonstrates that there is insufficient competent and reliable scientific evidence to substantiate claims that the Pom products treat, prevent or reduce the risk of erectile dysfunction or that they are clinically proven to do so.[POM Wonderful] shall not make any representation, in any manner, expressly or by implication, including through the use of a product name, endorsement, depiction, illustration, trademark or trade name, about the health benefits, performance or efficacy of any covered product, unless the representation is nonmisleading.

The May 22, 2012 Administrative Law Judge upheld two of POM's positions: (1) any FDA pre-approval requirement "would constitute unnecessary overreaching" and that (2) more stringent double-blind, randomized, placebo-controlled studies were not necessary.

In January 2015, The U.S. Court of Appeals for the D.C. Circuit upheld most of the FTC's 2010 order. The appellate court said that many of POM's ads "mischaracterized the scientific evidence concerning the health benefits of Pom's products with regard to those diseases."<ref>Pom Wonderful v. FTC; United States Court of Appeals for the District of Columbia Circuit, January 30, 2015 </ref>

In May 2016, the FTC and a U.S. federal court decided that POM cannot make health claims in its advertising, and the U.S. Supreme Court declined POM's request to review the court ruling that upheld the FTC decision. FTC Chairwoman Edith Ramirez agreed with the Supreme Court's decision by stating: "I am pleased that the POM Wonderful case has been brought to a successful conclusion. The outcome of this case makes clear that companies like POM making serious health claims about food and nutritional supplement products must have rigorous scientific evidence to back them up. Consumers deserve no less."

Minute Maid lawsuit 

From 2008 through 2014, POM litigated against The Coca-Cola Company's subsidiary, Minute Maid. The lawsuit claimed that the name of the product called Minute Maid Pomegranate Blueberry Flavored Blend of five juices was misleading because it contained 0.3% pomegranate juice and 99.4% apple juice.  The case went to the U.S. Supreme Court, which decided in June 2014 that a lawsuit for false advertising claims could be pursued against Coca-Cola, saying "Competitors may bring Lanham Act claims like POM's challenging food and beverage labels regulated by the FDCA." Legal analysts anticipate several more years of litigation on issues not argued in the Supreme Court, such as cause and magnitude of financial or brand injury to POM Wonderful resulting from the Minute Maid product.

The Greatest Movie Ever Sold
The company, product, executives and owner Lynda Resnick were featured in a 2011 documentary about product placement, marketing and advertising in movies and TV shows.  The film was entitled POM Wonderful Presents: The Greatest Movie Ever Sold''. POM agreed to pay one million dollars (subject to certain conditions) for "above-the-title" billing on the film.

References

External reading
 

Juice brands
Food manufacturers of the United States
Food product brands
Companies based in Los Angeles
Privately held companies based in California
Pomegranate products
The Wonderful Company
American companies established in 2002
2002 establishments in California